Temple Sinai or Sinai Temple may refer to:

Temple Sinai (Oakland, California), U.S.
Temple Sinai (Denver, Colorado), U.S.
Temple Sinai (New Orleans, Louisiana), U.S.
Temple Sinai (Sumter, South Carolina), U.S.
Temple Sinai (Houston), Texas, U.S.
Temple Sinai (Newport News, Virginia), U.S.
Temple Sinai (Portsmouth, Virginia), U.S.
Mount Sinai Temple (Sioux City, Iowa), U.S.
Sinai Temple (Los Angeles), California, U.S.
Sinai Temple (Springfield, Massachusetts), U.S.
Temple De Hirsch Sinai, formerly Temple Sinai, Bellevue, Washington, U.S.
Temple Emanuel Sinai (Worcester, Massachusetts), U.S.

See also

Sinai (disambiguation)

Synagogue